The Humber Bay Arch Bridge (also known as the Humber River Arch Bridge, the Humber River Pedestrian Bridge, or the Gateway Bridge) is a pedestrian and bicycle through arch bridge south of Lake Shore Boulevard West in Toronto, Ontario, Canada.

Design

Designed in 1994 by Montgomery Sisam Architects of Toronto and Delcan Corporation (bridge engineers), it was constructed by Sonterlan Construction, and is the recipient of numerous local architectural, design and engineering awards. The bridge is situated at the mouth of the Humber River, the start of the "Toronto Carrying Place" trail, an ancient aboriginal trading route leading north, and thus features design elements and decorations such as carved turtles and canoes that evoke this native heritage.

The bridge forms an important pedestrian, recreational and commuter cyclist link, and carries the Waterfront Trail, a multi-use pathway that will eventually parallel the entire north shore of Lake Ontario. The Toronto section is known as the Martin Goodman Trail, and is one of the most popular pedestrian and cycling routes in the city.

See also
 Waterfront Trail

References

Steel Project Case Study Gallery

Bridges in Toronto
Pedestrian bridges in Canada
Cyclist bridges in Canada
Through arch bridges in Canada